Tino Semmer (born 25 September 1985) is a German footballer who plays as a striker for Wacker Nordhausen.

References

External links

1985 births
Living people
People from Bautzen (district)
People from Bezirk Dresden
German footballers
Footballers from Saxony
Association football forwards
2. Bundesliga players
3. Liga players
Regionalliga players
FC Sachsen Leipzig players
FC Rot-Weiß Erfurt players
FC Hansa Rostock players
Chemnitzer FC players